Saint Charles (also known as Isis) is an unincorporated community in Butler County, in the U.S. state of Ohio.

History
A post office called Saint Charles was established in 1850, and remained in operation until 1905.

The community was named for Charles Stewart, an early settler.

References

Unincorporated communities in Butler County, Ohio
Unincorporated communities in Ohio